The Wisconsin State Capitol, located in Madison, Wisconsin, houses both chambers of the Wisconsin legislature along with the Wisconsin Supreme Court and the Office of the Governor. Completed in 1917, the building is the fifth to serve as the Wisconsin capitol since the first territorial legislature convened in 1836 and the third building since Wisconsin was granted statehood in 1848. The Wisconsin State Capitol is the tallest building in Madison, a distinction that has been preserved by legislation that prohibits buildings taller than the columns surrounding the dome (187 feet). The Capitol is located at the southwestern end of the Madison Isthmus. The streets surrounding the building form the Capitol Square, which is home to many restaurants and shops.

History

First capitol
The first capitol was a prefabricated wood-frame council house without heat or water that had been sent hastily to Belmont. Legislators met there for 42 days after Belmont was designated the capital of Wisconsin Territory. The session chose Madison as the site of the capitol, and Burlington, Iowa as the site of further legislative sessions until Madison could be ready. The council house and an associated lodging house still stand and are operated by the Wisconsin Historical Society as the First Capitol Historic Site.

Second capitol
The second capitol was constructed during 1837 in Madison of stone cut from Maple Bluff and oak cut locally. Located on the site of the present capitol, it was a small but typical frontier capitol that cost $60,000 to build.

Third capitol

Growing government needs forced the state to construct a new capitol, also on the site of the present capitol. This structure, with a similar U.S. Capitol-inspired dome, was built between 1857 and 1869. During 1882, it was expanded at a cost of $900,000, with two wings to the north and south. During 1903, however, a commission began researching replacement of the structure.

1904 fire
On the night of February 26, 1904, a gas jet ignited a newly varnished ceiling in the third capitol building. Although the building had an advanced fire-fighting system, the nearby University of Wisconsin–Madison's reservoir, which supplied the capitol, was empty, allowing the fire to spread substantially before the switch to alternative city water supplies could be made. Madison firefighters could not handle the blaze on their own, so additional men and equipment had to be brought from Milwaukee. The effectiveness of the reinforcements was initially hampered by very cold temperatures; by the time they reached Madison, their equipment had frozen and needed to be thawed. As a result, the entire structure, except the north wing, burned to the ground. Numerous records, books, and historical artifacts were lost, including the mount of Old Abe, a Civil War mascot. However, through the efforts of university students, much of the state law library was saved. The fire occurred just after the state legislature had voted to cancel the capitol's fire insurance policy.

Current building
Construction of the present capitol, the third in Madison, began in late 1906 and was completed in 1917 at a cost of $7.25 million. The architect was George B. Post & Sons from New York. Because of financial limitations and the need for immediate office space to house state government employees, the construction of the new building was extended over several years and emphasized building one wing at a time.

The Capitol is 284 feet, 5 inches tall from the ground floor to the top of the Wisconsin statue on the dome.

The Wisconsin statue on the dome was sculpted during 1920 by Daniel Chester French of New York. Its left hand holds a globe surmounted by an eagle and her right arm is outstretched to symbolize the state motto, "Forward". It wears a helmet with the state animal, the badger, on top. It is made of hollow bronze covered with gold leaf. Wisconsin is 15 feet, 5 inches tall and weighs three tons. The statue is commonly misidentified as Lady Forward or Miss Forward, which is the name of another statue on the capitol grounds.

The capitol ceiling, visible from the center of the building, features Resources of Wisconsin, a mural by Edwin Howland Blashfield. Due to the domed shape of the ceiling, the mural was painted in pieces and was assembled similarly to a jigsaw puzzle. It features a woman sitting on a throne of clouds, representing Wisconsin. Wisconsin is surrounded by other women, wrapped in a large American Flag, who are reaching for goods such as tobacco, lead, and fruits.

The capitol was constructed of 43 types of stone from six countries and eight states. The exterior stone is Bethel white granite from Vermont, making the exterior dome the largest granite dome in the world. The corridor floors, walls and columns are of marble from the states of Tennessee, Missouri, Vermont, Georgia, New York, and Maryland; granite from the states of Wisconsin and Minnesota; and limestone from the states of Minnesota and Illinois. Marble from the countries of France, Italy, Greece, Algeria and Germany, and syenite from Norway are also represented. Other Wisconsin granites are located throughout the public hallways on the ground, first, and second floors.

The building was designated a National Historic Landmark in 2001. A 1990 state law prevents any building within one mile of the capitol from being taller than the base of the columns surrounding and supporting its dome.

Restoration and renovation

From 1988 to 2002, the capitol underwent a renovation and restoration project costing $158.8 million. The project was performed wing by wing, the same as the original construction of the capitol. The purpose of the project was to convert the capitol into a modern working building, while restoring and preserving its original 1917 appearance. Remodeling projects of the 1960s and 70s had introduced features out of character with the architecture of the building, such as dropped ceilings, movable partitions and fluorescent light fixtures, and many original decorative stencils were painted over. The restoration project returned public spaces to their original appearance. Original decorative stencils were repaired. Stairs, which had been sealed during the 1970s, were uncovered. The exterior granite was cleaned and repaired by workers who rappelled down from the dome. The renovation plan also included integrating modern technology into the original architecture. Electrical, mechanical (such as plumbing and heating), and communications systems were upgraded; asbestos was removed, and air conditioning was added. The capitol basement floor was lowered two feet to provide additional usable office space. Legislative offices were rebuilt as two-room suites (originally legislators did not have offices in the capitol, only their desks in the Senate and Assembly chambers). Modern office furniture was designed to look like the original oak furniture.

Wisconsin Capitol sculpture program
Architect Post planned an elaborate sculpture program for the building. Initially the commission for the statue of Wisconsin on the top of the dome was promised to Helen Farnsworth Mears but when Daniel Chester French agreed to produce the finial figure, the commission was switched to him. This work, often referred to as the "Golden Lady", consists of an allegorical figure reminiscent of Athena, dressed in Greek garb, and wearing a helmet topped by a badger, the Wisconsin state totem. In the left hand it holds a globe with an eagle perched on top. Across its chest is a large W, for Wisconsin.

Post's original concept for the building required four small domes to be placed at the base of the large one, but the plans were changed and the domes were replaced by four sculptural groups by Karl Bitter. These groups (again, in Greek clothing) symbolized Faith, Strength, Prosperity and Abundance and Knowledge.

Each of the four wings of the building is fronted by a pediment whose figures relate to the principal activities that were to occur within. Thus the east wing, housing the Supreme Court, features a pediment by Bitter entitled Law; the south has Adolph Alexander Weinman's Virtues and Traits of Character, for the wing containing the State Senate. Bitter's other pediment, the west, is Agriculture, while Attilio Piccirilli's Wisdom and Learning of the World adorns the north pediment. The carving of all these sculptures is attributed to the Piccirilli Brothers.

Fossils
Naturally occurring fossils are found throughout the capitol:

 Starfish: North wing, left grand stairs, 1st to 2nd floor, fourth step from bottom
 Coral: West wing, second floor, railing overlooking central corridor, outside of Assembly chamber
 Nautiloid: North wing, second floor, left of north hearing room entrance
 Gastropod: West wing, left grand stairs; 1st to 2nd floor railing, above 9th step from top
 Ammonoid: North wing, second floor, north hearing room
 Bryozoan: South wing, second floor, left grand stairs, top step
 Burrows: Northwest, second floor, wall to right room 225 NW
 Brachiopods: East wing, ground floor, pillars near entrance

Images

See also
List of state and territorial capitols in the United States
2011 Wisconsin protests

References

Further reading 
 Dennis, James M. Karl Bitter Architectural Sculptor: 1867–1915, University of Wisconsin Press 1967.
 Keane, Michael J. "Restoring the Vision: The First Century of Wisconsin's Capitol". In Wisconsin Legislative Reference Bureau. State of Wisconsin 2001-2002 Blue Book. Madison: Wisconsin Legislature Joint Committee on Legislative Organization, 2001, pp. 99–188.
 Lombardo, Josef Vincent. Atilio Piccirilli: Life of an American Sculptor, Pitman Publishing Corporation, New York, 1944.
 Landau, Sarah Bradford. George B. Post: Picturesque Designer and Determined Realist, The Montacelli Press, New York, NY, 1998.
 Rajer, Anton and Christine Style. Public Sculpture in Wisconsin: An Atlas of Outdoor Monuments, Memorials and Masterpieces in the Badger State, SOS! Save Outdoor Sculpture, Wisconsin, Madison Wisconsin, 1999.
 Schevill, Ferdinand. Karl Bitter – A Biography, University of Chicago Press, Chicago Illinois, 1917.
 Wisconsin Department of Administration. Wisconsin State Capitol: Guide and History. 37th ed. Madison, Wis.: Author, 2014.

External links 

 Wisconsin State Capitol National Historic Landmark Nomination
 Wisconsin State Capitol Historic Structure Report (1995–2005)
 Information on the State Capitol from the State of Wisconsin

Government buildings completed in 1917
Museums in Madison, Wisconsin
History museums in Wisconsin
Capitol
State capitols in the United States
National Historic Landmarks in Wisconsin
Government buildings with domes
Rotundas in the United States
Buildings and structures in Madison, Wisconsin
Culture of Madison, Wisconsin
Government buildings in Wisconsin
Tourist attractions in Madison, Wisconsin
Government buildings on the National Register of Historic Places in Wisconsin
Fires at legislative buildings
National Register of Historic Places in Madison, Wisconsin
Terminating vistas in the United States
Skyscrapers in Madison, Wisconsin
Skyscraper office buildings in Wisconsin
Beaux-Arts architecture in Wisconsin